Kafch (also Romanized as Kāfch; also  known as Gerīcheh, Kadcheh, Kāfj, and Kedcheh) is a village in Bala Velayat Rural District, Bala Velayat District, Bakharz County, Razavi Khorasan Province, Iran. At the 2006 census, its population was 587, in 124 families.

References 

Populated places in Bakharz County